The West Arnhem Region is a local government area of the Northern Territory, Australia and is administered by the West Arnhem Regional Council.

History
In October 2006 the Northern Territory Government announced the reform of local government areas. The intention of the reform was to improve and expand the delivery of services to towns and communities across the Northern Territory by establishing eleven new shires. The West Arnhem Shire was created on 1 July 2008. Elections of Shire Councillors were held on 25 October 2008. 

As of 2017 the Mayor of the West Arnhem Shire was Matthew Ryan.

On 1 January 2014, the Shire became the West Arnhem Region.

The Region formerly consisted of unincorporated land, plus small areas under the control of Community Government Councils or incorporated communities:

 Town of Jabiru
 Maningrida Community
 Gunbalanya Community
 Minjilang Community
 Warruwi Community

Wards
West Arnhem Regional Council is divided into four wards with three councillors each:
 Gunbalanya (3) 
 Kakadu (3) 
 Maningrida (3) 
 Barrah (3)

Localities and communities
Land within the West Arnhem Region was divided during 2007 into bounded areas for the purpose of creating an address for a property.  The bounded areas are called "localities" with those localities associated with aboriginal communities being called "communities".

Localities
Cobourg
Jabiru
Kakadu	
Van Diemen Gulf
West Arnhem

Communities
Gunbalanya	
Minjilang		
Maningrida	
Warruwi

References

External links
West Arhnem Regional Council website
Map of LGAs
Policy details

Local government areas of the Northern Territory
Arnhem Land